The Mijares or Millars is a river in Aragon and the Valencian Community, eastern Spain. It flows into the Mediterranean Sea between Almassora and Burriana. The Mijares River marks the southernmost limit of the Catalan Mediterranean System.

This river originates at a height of 1,600 m in the Sierra de Gúdar, Sistema Ibérico. It is 156 km long, with a 4,028 km2 wide basin and an average flow of 14.72 m3 per second at Cirat. This river is the main source of irrigation water for agriculture in the Plana Baixa comarca.

See also 
 List of rivers of Spain

References

External links 

Riu Millars video

Rivers of Spain
Rivers of the Valencian Community
Rivers of Aragon